In enzymology, a phosphoadenylylsulfatase is an enzyme that catalyzes the chemical reaction

3'-phosphoadenylyl sulfate + H2O  adenosine 3',5'-bisphosphate + sulfate

Thus, the two substrates of this enzyme are 3'-phosphoadenylyl sulfate and H2O, whereas its two products are adenosine 3',5'-bisphosphate and sulfate.

This enzyme belongs to the family of hydrolases, specifically those acting on acid anhydrides in sulfonyl-containing anhydrides. The systematic name of this enzyme class is 3'-phosphoadenylyl-sulfate sulfohydrolase. Other names in common use include 3-phosphoadenylyl sulfatase, 3-phosphoadenosine 5-phosphosulfate sulfatase, PAPS sulfatase, and 3'-phosphoadenylylsulfate sulfohydrolase. This enzyme participates in sulfur metabolism. It employs one cofactor, manganese.

References

 

EC 3.6.2
Manganese enzymes
Enzymes of unknown structure